Kaijomaa is a Finnish surname. Notable people with the surname include:

Juuso Kaijomaa (born 1989), Finnish ice hockey player
Kalle Kaijomaa (born 1984), Finnish ice hockey player

Finnish-language surnames